Nicholas Eason (born May 29, 1980) is an American football coach and former defensive end who is currently the defensive tackles coach and run game coordinator at Clemson University. He previously served as an assistant coach for the Auburn Tigers, Cincinnati Bengals, Tennessee Titans and Cleveland Browns.

Eason played college football at Clemson and was drafted by the Denver Broncos in the fourth round of the 2003 NFL Draft and would play for 11 seasons in the National Football League (NFL) with the Broncos, Cleveland Browns, Pittsburgh Steelers, and Arizona Cardinals. Eason also previously played for the Scottish Claymores. Against the Cardinals, Eason won Super Bowl XLIII with the Steelers.

Playing career

College
Eason played college football at Clemson. He played in 47 games starting in 35 and finished his career with 153 tackles and 15 sacks. He graduated from Clemson in August 2001 with a degree in sociology and is currently working on his master's degree in Human Resource Development.

National Football League

Denver Broncos and Scottish Claymores
Eason was originally drafted in the 4th round (114th overall) of the 2003 draft by the Denver Broncos. His first season was ended by an Achilles injury. In 2004, he was allocated to NFL Europe and played for the Scottish Claymores. On returning, he spent some time on the practice squad before being waived on September 24, 2004.

Cleveland Browns
Eason was signed by the Cleveland Browns on 11 November 2004 and played in one game recording two tackles. The 2005 season was his first full season with the Browns and he played in 16 games recording 19 tackles and a career high two sacks. In 2006, Eason recorded 23 tackles from 13 games.

Pittsburgh Steelers
Eason signed with the Pittsburgh Steelers as an unrestricted free agent on April 16, 2007. In his first season with the team, he played in all 16 games and recorded 14 tackles. In 2008, the Steelers resigned Eason to a 2-year contract.

Eason was released on October 3, 2009 after the Steelers signed Isaac Redman from their practice squad, then re-signed when Redman was waived on October 5. Eason was promoted to the main roster and started in place of the injured defensive end Brett Keisel. In week 17, the final game of the regular season, he had 4 tackles (including a critical tackle for a 3-yard loss on Ricky Williams) against the Dolphins.

Arizona Cardinals
Eason was signed by the Arizona Cardinals on July 29, 2011.

Coaching career

Cleveland Browns
In 2013, Eason began his coaching career with the Cleveland Browns as their assistant defensive line coach under head coach Rob Chudzinski.

Tennessee Titans
In 2014, Eason was hired by the Tennessee Titans as their defensive line coach under head Ken Whisenhunt. In 2016, he was retained under the Titans new head coach Mike Mularkey.

Cincinnati Bengals
On February 26, 2019 Eason was hired by the Cincinnati Bengals as their defensive line coach under head coach Zac Taylor.

Eason missed the team's weeks 12 and 13 games in 2020 against the New York Giants and Miami Dolphins due to COVID-19 pandemic protocols.

Auburn University
On January 27, 2021, Eason joined Auburn University as their defensive line coach under head coach Bryan Harsin, replacing Tracy Rocker.

Clemson University
On January 7, 2022, Eason was hired by his alma mater, Clemson University, as their defensive tackles coach and run game coordinator under head coach Dabo Swinney, replacing Todd Bates.

References

External links
 Auburn Tigers profile
 Cincinnati Bengals profile
 Clemson Tigers player profile
 

1980 births
Living people
Players of American football from Georgia (U.S. state)
People from Lyons, Georgia
African-American coaches of American football
African-American players of American football
American football defensive tackles
American football defensive ends
Clemson Tigers football coaches
Clemson Tigers football players
Denver Broncos players
Scottish Claymores players
Cleveland Browns players
Pittsburgh Steelers players
Arizona Cardinals players
Auburn Tigers football coaches
Cincinnati Bengals coaches
Cleveland Browns coaches
Tennessee Titans coaches
21st-century African-American sportspeople
20th-century African-American people
Ed Block Courage Award recipients